Presidential elections were held in Moldova on 30 October 2016. They were the first direct presidential elections since 1996 and followed a declaration by the Constitutional Court on 4 March 2016 that the 2000 constitutional revision that led to the president being indirectly elected by Parliament was unconstitutional. The elections were won by Igor Dodon of the Party of Socialists of the Republic of Moldova (PSRM).

Candidates

Withdrawn candidates:
Marian Lupu – withdrew on 26 October and endorsed Maia Sandu.
Andrei Năstase – withdrew on 15 October and supported a common candidate from the centre-right opposition, Maia Sandu.
Inna Popenco – registration was annulled on 22 October by a court decision upon the CEC request.

Candidates who got registration refusal by CEC:
Vitalia Pavlicenco
Vasile Tarlev
Roman Mihăeș
Ion Dron

Candidates who failed to collect the required number of signatures:
Oleg Brega – announced his withdrawal on 12 September, claiming the CEC were dishonest;
Anatol Plugaru – announced his withdrawal from the race on 23 September, declaring the election "unconstitutional";
Mihai Corj;
Artur Croitor;
Ilie Rotaru;
Vadim Brinzan;
Mihail Garbuz;
Geta Saviţcaia.

The Party of Communists of the Republic of Moldova did not nominate a candidate and called on voters to boycott the elections as they considered them to be illegal. The Liberal Democratic Party of Moldova also failed to nominate a candidate, instead supporting a common candidate from the centre-right opposition, Maia Sandu.

Opinion polls

First round

* Other candidate Renato Usatîi may not participate. Each candidate must be at least 42 years of age.

Second round

Dodon–Sandu

Conduct

Signature collection
Marian Lupu, the candidate of the Democratic Party of Moldova, collected over 20,000 signatures in his support and submitted them to the Central Electoral Commission in less than a day. The swiftness of the procedure was deemed suspicious, because the required stamps and signatures had to be obtained from public institutions that were closed at the time the party supporters could have collected them.

An independent candidate, Oleg Brega, filed a complaint with the Commission, indicating that the DPM must have received preferential treatment as their paperwork was handled on Friday after working hours, as well as on Saturday, a non-working day. The CEC dismissed the complaint and in the aftermath Brega decided to drop out of the presidential race, considering it unfair. A separate complaint was filed by Andrei Năstase on the same grounds.

Lupu stated that it was due to the effectiveness of his staff, rather than cheating.

Voter roll
Prior to the elections the Central Electoral Commission announced that the total number of voters was 3.2 million, an implausible figure, given the steady decline in Moldova's population, and the fact that preliminary results of the 2014 demographic survey indicated that the total population of the country was only three million.

An independent investigation revealed that the lists of voters prepared by the Central Electoral Commission were inaccurate and contained a significant number of deceased people. From a sample of 300 deceased, 100 were still listed as eligible to cast their vote, according to the online voter registry managed by the CEC.

The voter list included some prominent figures, such as the movie director Emil Loteanu (died in 2003), the actor Mihai Volontir (died in 2015) and the journalist Constantin Tănase (died in 2014).

The Commission acknowledged that the lists were not fully accurate, but pointed out that only three out of the alleged 100 were present on the list. They stated that at the time of the journalists' investigation, the online database reflected data from previously held elections, rather than the most up-to-date figures.

Overseas voting issues
Numerous overseas voters in Europe were unable to vote due insufficient ballot papers being available. However, the number of voters unable to vote was thought to be lower than Dodon's margin of victory.

Results
As none of the candidates was able to achieve a majority on 30 October 2016, a second round of voting took place on 13 November 2016 between the two leading candidates, Igor Dodon of PSRM and Maia Sandu of PAS. Dodon won the second round with 52.11% of the vote and became the fifth President of Moldova on 23 December.

References

External links
Election of the President of the Republic of Moldova, October 30, 2016 eDemocracy

Moldvoa
2016 in Moldova
Presidential elections in Moldova
October 2016 events in Europe
November 2016 events in Europe